Xilin Chan Temple is a Buddhist temple located in Yueyang Subdistrict, Songjiang District of Shanghai. The modern temple was built between 1986 and 2003.

History
The temple traces its origins to the former "Xilin Vihara", founded by Hu Zengchu in 872, in the ruling of Yizong Emperor of the Tang dynasty (618–907). Originally known as "Jiedai Temple" in the Southern Song dynasty (1127–1279), and later renamed "Ting'en Temple" and "Chong'en Temple", Yingzong Emperor of Ming dynasty (1368–1644) inscribed and honored the name "Xilin Chan Temple of Great Ming" in the mid-15th century. The temple was destroyed by fire during the Mongolian invasion of the 13th century, and was restored and reconstructed in 1387, at the dawn of Ming dynasty.

The temple became dilapidated for neglect during the Republic of China (1912–1949). It was devastated by the Red Guards during the ten-year Cultural Revolution. After the 3rd Plenary Session of the 11th Central Committee of the Communist Party of China, according to the national policy of free religious belief, Xilin Chan Temple was officially reopened to the public. In 1992, abbot Shi Xingxiu supervised the reconstruction of Kunlu Hall and Mahavira Hall.

Architecture
Along the central axis of the temple stand four buildings including the Shanmen, Mahavira Hall, Yuanying Pagoda and Kunlu Hall, which were completed between 1986 and 2003.

Yuanying Pagoda
It is made of brick and stone. The Song dynasty (960–1279) Chinese pagoda was built in memory of Chan master Yuanying.

Gallery

References

Buddhist temples in Shanghai
Buildings and structures in Shanghai
Tourist attractions in Shanghai
20th-century establishments in China
20th-century Buddhist temples
Religious buildings and structures completed in 2003